Following is a list of senators of Moselle, people who have represented the department of Moselle in the Senate of France.

Third Republic

Senators for Moselle under the French Third Republic were:

 Henri Collin (1920–1921)
 Maurice Bompard (1920–1933)
 Henri de Marguerie (1920–1933)
 Auguste Édouard Hirschauer (1920–1940)
 Jean Stuhl (1920–1940)
 Jean-Marie de Berthier de Sauvigny (1922–1926)
 Guy de Wendel (1927–1940)
 Édouard Corbedaine (1933–1940)
 Jules Wolff (1933–1940)

Fourth Republic

Senators for Moselle under the French Fourth Republic were:

 Gabriel Hocquard (1946–1948)
 André Rausch (1946–1948)
 Pierre Muller (1946–1948)
 Jean-Éric Bousch (1948–1959)
 Paul Driant (1948–1959)
 René Schwartz (1948–1959)

Fifth Republic 
Senators for Moselle under the French Fifth Republic were:

References

Sources

 
Lists of members of the Senate (France) by department